Pomfret Plantation is a  historic house located at Marion, Somerset County, Maryland, United States. It is a two-story, four room plan gable roofed frame house constructed between 1810 and 1830. A two-story hyphen joins an early 19th-century kitchen wing to the main block.  The property also includes a post-Civil War frame tenant house, and a 19th-century Coulbourne family cemetery. The Coulbourne family and their descendants owned the property through nine continuous generations beginning with William Coulbourne in 1663, and ending with the sale of the farm in 1921.

The Pomfret Plantation was listed on the National Register of Historic Places in 1984.

References

External links
, including photo from 1984, at Maryland Historical Trust

Houses in Somerset County, Maryland
Houses on the National Register of Historic Places in Maryland
Houses completed in 1830
Plantation houses in Maryland
1830 establishments in Maryland
National Register of Historic Places in Somerset County, Maryland